Charles Jenny (born April 1897, date of death unknown) was a Swiss bobsledder who competed in the early 1930s. He finished fourth in the four-man event at the 1932 Winter Olympics in Lake Placid, New York.

References
1932 bobsleigh four-man results
Charles Jenny's profile at Sports Reference.com

1897 births
Year of death missing
Olympic bobsledders of Switzerland
Bobsledders at the 1932 Winter Olympics
Swiss male bobsledders